Htay Oo (born 20 January 1950) is a Burmese former politician and military officer, and previously served as Pyithu Hluttaw MP for Hinthada constituency  from 2011 to 2016. He also served as Minister for Agriculture and Irrigation of Myanmar from 18 September 2004 to 30 March 2011, and Minister for Cooperatives in 2003. He was formerly a retired major general in the Myanmar Army. Htay Oo was elected Deputy chairman of the Union Solidarity and Development Party, and served from October 2012 to August 2015. He was succeeded to Myat Hein in that role, and was then elected as the chairman of Party Central Leading Committee of the Union Solidarity and Development Party in August 2015.

References

Agriculture ministers of Myanmar
Government ministers of Myanmar
Burmese military personnel
People from Ayeyarwady Region
1950 births
Members of Pyithu Hluttaw
Living people
Union Solidarity and Development Party politicians